Hanna is a fictional character created by screenwriters Seth Lochhead and David Farr. She appears in both the 2011 live action film Hanna and the 2019 TV series of the same name. She is portrayed by Saoirse Ronan in the film and Esmé Creed-Miles in the television series.

Early life

In the film Hanna's year and place of birth are not revealed but in the TV series she is shown in 2003 as a very small baby in a secret facility in Darabani, Romania. In both the film and at the start of the series she is 15 years old except in brief flashbacks to her earlier life. Her birth mother was Johanna (Zadek in the film, Petrescu, born 1980 in the series) who died whilst she was rescuing Hanna from the facility with her partner, German former CIA agent Erik Heller. Erik escapes with Hanna and her childhood and early adolescence is spent living alone with him in the forest (Finland in the film, Poland in the series) to hide from the CIA. For the first 15 years of her life Hanna believes Erik to be her birth father, but she later learns he is not. It is revealed that Erik persuaded Johanna not to abort Hanna so the baby could be part of a CIA programme called UTRAX.

In the television series it is revealed that Hanna's real father is named Emil Prodna and at the time Emil did not want to have a relationship with Johanna and have Hanna as his daughter. However when Erik takes her at the age of 15 to meet Emil, his current wife, and his other three children, Emil is happy to meet Hanna and offers her a place to stay in safety. Hanna however gives this up for Erik.

Appearance and character
Hanna is 5ft 2in (157cm) tall with blue eyes. In the film she has blonde hair, but in the TV series it is brown, although in season 2, she dyes her hair blonde. She has pale skin and her build is slim and athletic, partly due to the intense physical exercise that Erik makes her undertake and partly due to the fact that the CIA used UTRAX to enhanced her DNA in order to breed super soldiers. Due to this Hanna is exceptionally strong for a girl her age and build and has great stamina when running.

As she lived in the forest she was home schooled by Erik. Whilst not being unlearned at all she has little knowledge of the practicalities of the modern outside world (she is amazed by an aeroplane and had not heard of Snapchat). Erik raised her to be prolific in languages as she speaks at least English, German, Italian and French. Aside from that she excels at hunting and shooting and hand-to-hand combat skills Erik knew she'd need when she left the forest to evade the CIA. By series 2 on TV she had learnt to drive a car, is comfortable with modern technology and has lost her social naivety.

Hanna's first friendship is with a 17 year old Polish logger in the forest and her first close friend is an English girl named Sophie who is around her own age. Having been raised alone by Erik she has nothing but theoretical knowledge of romance. She rejects the advances of boys who like her, except when she drinks some vodka. Not knowing the effect the drink would have on her she kisses a boy in what others see as an unacceptable public display of affection, whilst she knows no better. She later loses her virginity to an English boy called Anton. It is hinted that Sophie is sexually attracted to Hanna and at one stage Sophie kisses her on the mouth, but Hanna just sees this as a normal part of friendship. Her character is summarised on one of the promotional film posters as "Young. Sweet. Innocent. Deadly." When Marissa Wiegler, Hanna and Erik's nemesis, tries to befriend the girl by labelling her "unique" Hanna replies "Unique just means alone". Sophie's mother Rachel comments that Hanna is much like her at her age a "loner". By series 3 it is shown that although Hanna has been trained by UTRAX, her moral upbringing by Erik means she does not kill blindly and begins to work against them.

See also
 List of child superheroes
 Hannah (name)

References

Female characters in film
Film characters introduced in 2011
Teenage characters in film
Fictional European people
Adoptee characters in films
Adoptee characters in television
Fictional super soldiers
Fictional female assassins